The 2014–15 NCAA Division I men's ice hockey season began in October 2014 and ended with the 2015 NCAA Division I Men's Ice Hockey Tournament's championship game in April 2015. This was the 68th season in which an NCAA ice hockey championship was held, and the 121st year overall in which an NCAA school fielded a team.

Conference realignment
The only conference membership change in the 2014 offseason was the move of the Connecticut Huskies from Atlantic Hockey to Hockey East, which was already home to the UConn women's team.

Polls

Pre-season
The top 20 from USCHO.com, September 29, 2014, and the top 15 from USA Today/USA Hockey Magazine, September 29, 2014. First place votes are in parentheses.

Regular season

Standings

2015 NCAA Tournament

Note: * denotes overtime period(s)

Player stats

Scoring leaders

GP = Games played; G = Goals; A = Assists; Pts = Points; PIM = Penalty minutes

Leading goaltenders

GP = Games played; Min = Minutes played; W = Wins; L = Losses; T = Ties; GA = Goals against; SO = Shutouts; SV% = Save percentage; GAA = Goals against average

Awards

NCAA

Atlantic Hockey

Big Ten

ECAC

Hockey East

NCHC

WCHA

Hobey Baker Award

Mike Richter Award

Spencer Penrose Award

See also
 2014–15 NCAA Division II men's ice hockey season
 2014–15 NCAA Division III men's ice hockey season

References

 
NCAA